Ville Vahalahti (born 7 November 1977 in Pargas, Finland) is a Finnish ice hockey player currently playing for Lukko of the Finnish Liiga.

Playing career
Vahalahti started his professional career in the second highest division of hockey in Finland. There he played for the team Kiekko-67 Turku. After two seasons, he advanced to the SM-liiga team TPS.

He spent the 2007–08 season with Linköpings HC of the Swedish Elitserien, but upon completion of the year returned to TPS signing a two-year contract. After a strong return with TPS, Vahalahti was named to represent Finland at the 2009 Men's World Ice Hockey Championships in Switzerland.

During the 2009–10 season on 19 March 2010, Vahalahti signed a two-year contract extension to remain with TPS.

Career statistics

Regular season and playoffs

International

References

External links

Finnish ice hockey forwards
1977 births
Living people
Linköping HC players
HC TPS players
TuTo players
Lukko players
Finnish expatriate ice hockey players in Sweden
People from Pargas
Sportspeople from Southwest Finland